Selkirk Aerodrome,  is located  south southwest of Selkirk, Ontario, Canada.

References

Registered aerodromes in Ontario
Buildings and structures in Haldimand County